William M. Grant (September 20, 1868 – 1931) was a real estate agent and political figure in Saskatchewan. He represented Batoche in the Legislative Assembly of Saskatchewan from 1905 to 1908 as a Liberal.

He was born in Princeton, Ontario, the son of Adam Grant and Lucinda Everette, and was educated there. In 1905, Grant married Catherine Henry. For a time, he worked at the jail in Regina, Saskatchewan. He also was a farming instructor at the Regina Industrial School. Grant later worked as an agent for the Massey-Harris company.

See also
Politics of Canada

References 

Saskatchewan Liberal Party MLAs
1868 births
1931 deaths